Aultman is an unincorporated community in Indiana County, Pennsylvania, United States. Aultman had a post office until it closed on September 28, 2002; it still has its own ZIP code, 15713.

References

Unincorporated communities in Indiana County, Pennsylvania
Unincorporated communities in Pennsylvania